Kevin L. Williams (born August 4, 1975) is a former professional American football defensive back in the National Football League. He played four seasons for the New York Jets, Miami Dolphins, and Houston Texans.

Professional career

New York Jets (1998-2000) 
Williams was selected by the Pittsburgh Steelers but ended up with the New York Jets in the 1998 NFL Draft due to a draft day trade. He was selected in the 3rd round (87th overall).

1998 
Williams played in 15 games and started in 6 for the Jets in his rookie season, playing free safety and kick returner. He recorded 32 tackles, one interception, and a forced fumble.

1999 
Williams had a disappointing 1999 season, only appearing in 4 games. This season was notably the Jets' last season with Bill Parcells as head coach and the team promoted Bill Belichick, the defensive coordinator, to head coach. However, Belichick was uncomfortable with the recent change in ownership and resigned one day after being named head coach in an infamous press conference. In the press conference, Belichick lauded Williams, stating, "that kid has gone through so much and I was just kind of thinking to myself the commitment that Kevin has made just to live and [he represents] what it takes to win in this league..."

2000 
Williams played in 9 games and started 7 in his 2000 season with the Jets. He amassed a career high in kick return yards (615) and returned a kick 97 yards for a touchdown.

References

1975 births
Living people
Sportspeople from Pine Bluff, Arkansas
Players of American football from Arkansas
American football safeties
American football cornerbacks
Oklahoma State Cowboys football players
New York Jets players
Miami Dolphins players
Houston Texans players